The National Electrostatics Corporation (NEC), a company based in Wisconsin, USA, produces particle accelerators and associated equipment. The firm incorporated in 1965, and  has a workforce of approximately 105 people.

NEC's linear accelerators range in voltage from a few kilovolts to a 25 Megavolt machine at Oak Ridge National Laboratory - the highest-voltage accelerator in the world .

External links
 http://www.pelletron.com/

Particle accelerators
Companies based in Wisconsin
Manufacturing companies based in Wisconsin